Sock and Awe is a minimal 2008 Flash game created by British entrepreneur Alex Tew, recreating the Bush shoeing incident and putting the player in control of journalist Muntadar al-Zaidi who flung a shoe at George W. Bush during a news conference. While a hastily-put together crudity, it went viral and received widespread news coverage right around its release, only a day after the actual incident. It's a well-known example of a newsgame. The name of the game is a pun on the US shock and awe military tactic.

Release
Alex Tew, the author, was a "student entrepreneur" at the time, and previously "Internet famous" for The Million Dollar Homepage, a successful ploy website that helped him pay for his college tuition. On December 18, the day of the shoe throwing incident, Tew was part of a group of people on Twitter trading ideas  on what might be a good tabloid headline describing the incident when somebody suggested "Sock and Awe." Already by the following day, Tew had registered the domain sockandawe.com, developed and uploaded the game. Two days later, the game had already been played 1.4 million times. At the end of the week, Tew had managed to sell the site on eBay for £5,215 GBP to a company called Fubra. Tew cheekily commented to a Reuters journalist: "From Monday concept, Tuesday launch, Wednesday growth, we’ve had a Thursday exit." By December 22, 49 million shoes had been thrown in the game.

Copycat games
While the game's crudeness has meant its remained mostly uncommented on in video gaming academia, the mainstream media attention it received motivated several other game developers to try their hand at similar newsgames. At least 9 copycat games shoe throwing games were created, and the creator behind Raid Gaza!, Marcus Richter, later cited Sock and Awe as an outright inspiration for his game. The game was one of Tew's enterprises that caused Milo Yiannopoulos to, in a tongue-in-cheek manner, call him the "most annoying man on the Internet."

References

2008 video games
Browser games
Flash games
Cultural depictions of George W. Bush
Parody video games
Political satire video games
Video games developed in the United Kingdom
Video games set in 2008
Iraq War video games